R. N. Abhyankar (dates unknown) was an Indian first-class cricketer active 1961–1968 who played for Vidarbha. He made 15 appearances, scoring 467 runs with a highest score of 73, and took ten wickets with a best innings return of three for 47.

References

Date of birth unknown
Date of death unknown
Indian cricketers
Vidarbha cricketers